Wisconsin's 6th congressional district is a congressional district of the United States House of Representatives in eastern Wisconsin. It is based in the rural, suburban and exurban communities between Madison, Milwaukee, and Green Bay. It also includes the village of River Hills in far northern Milwaukee County. The district is currently represented by Glenn Grothman (R-Glenbeaulah) who took office in January 2015.

The 6th district has a long history of farming livestock in rural areas, and is a major producer of both milk and grains.

The 6th district has been a Republican stronghold for most of its history; since the 1930s, only one Democrat, John A. Race, represented the district between 1965 and 1967. With a Cook PVI of R+10, it is tied with the 8th district as the third-most Republican district in Wisconsin. The 6th district's Republican lean extends to presidential races; since 1952, only three Democrats have carried it: Lyndon B. Johnson in 1964, Bill Clinton in 1996, and Barack Obama in 2008, all three of whom swept the state of Wisconsin in landslides. In the 2020 Presidential Election, the district voted 57% for Donald Trump and 42% for Joe Biden.

Counties and municipalities within the district

Calumet County
 New Holstein.

Columbia County
 Arlington, Cambria, Columbus, Doylestown, Fall River, Friesland, Lodi, Pardeeville, Portage, Poynette, Rio, Wisconsin Dells (Columbia County section), and Wyocena.

Dodge County
 Beaver Dam, Brownsville, Fox Lake, Lomira, Mayville, Randolph, Theresa, and Waupun.

Fond du Lac County
 Brandon, Campbellsport, Eden, Fairwater, Fond du Lac, Mount Calvary, North Fond du Lac, Oakfield, Ripon, Rosendale, and St. Cloud.

Green Lake County
 Berlin, Green Lake, Kingston, Markesan, Marquette, and Princeton.

Manitowoc County
 Cleveland, Francis Creek, Kellnersville, Kiel, Manitowoc, Maribel, Mishicot, Reedsville, Șt. Nazianz, Two Rivers, Valders, and Whitelaw.

Marquette County
 Endeavor, Montello, Neshkoro, Oxford, and Westfield.

Ozaukee
 Belgium, Cedarburg, Fredonia, Grafton, Port Washington, Saukville, and Thiensville.

Sheboygan
 Adell, Cascade, Cedar Grove, Elkhart Lake, Glenbeulah, Kohler, Oostburg, Plymouth, Random Lake, Sheboygan, Sheboygan Falls, and Waldo.

Waushara
 Coloma, Hancock, Lohrville Plainfield, Redgranite, Wautoma, and Wild Rose.

Winnebago
 Appleton (part), Fox Crossing, Menasha, Neenah, Omro, Oshkosh, and Winneconne.

History 
Wisconsin's 6th congressional district came into existence in 1863 following the federal census of 1860. The first elected representative from the district was Walter D. McIndoe of Wausau. The district originally comprised the counties of the northern and western parts of the state. Following subsequent congressional reapportionment after each decennial census, the district's boundaries shifted eastward.

Census of 1860 

The reapportionment of Congressional districts following the federal census of 1860 gave Wisconsin three additional members in the House of Representatives. Members elected from the newly created 4th, 5th and 6th districts were chosen in the midterm elections of 1862 and took their seats in the lower house as part of the 38th United States Congress.

The 6th District originally included the counties of Adams, Ashland, Bad Ax (Vernon), Buffalo, Burnett, Dallas (Barron), Chippewa, Clark, Douglas, Dunn, Eau Claire, Jackson, Juneau, La Crosse, La Pointe, Marathon, Monroe, Pepin, Pierce, Polk, Portage, St. Croix, Trempealeau, and Wood.

Areas of east central Wisconsin, which make up much of the 6th district today, were originally part of the newly created 5th district.

Census of 1870 

Following the 1870 census Wisconsin gained two seats in the House of Representatives. The new 6th District was shifted eastward and included many counties in northeast Wisconsin. It included the counties of Brown, Calumet, Door, Green Lake, Kewaunee, Outagamie, Waupaca, Waushara and Winnebago. Representative Philetus Sawyer of Oshkosh had been elected to Congress from Wisconsin's 5th District since 1865, was then elected from the newly configured 6th District. He later served the state as a member of the U.S. Senate.

Census of 1880 
 The federal census of 1880 showed further population growth in Wisconsin and the state gained a 9th Congressional seat. Reapportionment of the state moved the 6th District to a more central location within the state, though the representatives elected from the district came from the communities along the shores of Lake Winnebago throughout the decade. The 6th District now included the counties of Adams, Green Lake, Marquette, Outagamie, Waushara and Winnebago.

Census of 1890 
 Following the census of 1890 Wisconsin gained a 10th Congressional seat. The 6th District shifted eastward to a configuration that closely resembled that of today's linear east to west shape with a population of 187,001.  The state population was enumerated at 1,686,880. The 6th District then included the counties of Calumet, Fond du Lac, Green Lake, Marquette, Marquette, Waushara and Winnebago.

Census of 1900 
 The state's population reached 2,069,042 according to the 1900 federal census and Wisconsin gained an additional seat in the House of Representatives. This was the peak of Wisconsin's Congressional representation and the state maintained 11 members of the House of Representatives until the opening of the 73rd United States Congress in 1933. The 6th District shifted southward and included the counties of Dodge, Fond du Lac, Ozaukee, Sheboygan and Washington.  The counties in the vicinity of Lake Winnebago became part of the 8th District.  The population of the counties making up the 6th District totaled 184,517.

Censuses of 1910 & 1920 
 The 1910 census tabulated a population of 2,333,860 citizens for Wisconsin and the 1920 census saw the state's population grow to 2,632,670. As a result of this growth, the state retained its 11 seats in the House of Representatives throughout the 1910s and 1920s. Prior to congressional elections in 1912, the 6th District was reconfigured in manner closer to that of the 1893 apportionment. The district included the counties of Calument, Fond du Lac, Green Lake, Manitowoc, Marquette, and Winnebago. All 11 districts continued in the same configurations until the elections of 1932. The 6th district grew from 201,637 to 214,206 between the two enumerations.

Censuses of 1930, 1940 & 1950 
 Wisconsin lost a congressional seat following the census of 1930. The 6th District now included Calumet, Fond du Lac, Ozaukee, Sheboygan, Washington, and Winnebago counties.  According to the 1950 census, the population of the district was 315,666. This southeastern shift of the district remained in effect for 30 years, ending with the 1962 elections.

Census of 1960 
 The state held on to all 10 of its Congressional seats following the 1960 census. As a result of changing population patterns, the districts were reapportioned. Green Lake County was added to the existing counties of the 6th District, which were Calumet, Fond du Lac, Ozaukee, Sheboygan, Washington and Winnebago. This slight western shift gave the district a population of 391,743.

It was also during this era, that the Republican Party's domination of the district was broken. Democrat John Abner Race, represented the district from 1965 to 1967. Other than this brief interruption, a Republican has been sent to Washington, D.C. in every election since 1938.

Census of 1970 
 The state of Wisconsin gained 465,318 residents for a total of 4,418,683 according to the 1970 census. Because this was a lower increase than other areas of the country, the state lost a seat in the House of Representatives, requiring the state's districts to be reapportioned.

The 6th District now extended farther west than at any time other since its original configuration in 1860.  It now included all or portions of Adams, Calumet, Fond du Lac, Green Lake, Juneau, Manitowoc, Marquette, Monroe, Sheboygan, Waushara, and Winnebago counties.

This was the first time, other than in Milwaukee County, that districts did not follow county borders throughout the state.  The Town of Waupun in Fond du Lac County was included in the 2nd District. Only the five easternmost towns in Monroe County were included in the 6th District.

Census of 1980 
 Following the 1980 census the 6th District again expanded in size.  All of Monroe County now became part of the district, which was a further westward expansion.  All of Waupaca County and the southwest corner of Wood County expanded the district to the north.  Southern towns in Adams, Juneau, Fond du Lac and Sheboygan counties, as well as the city of Sheboygan, were removed from the district and included in the 2nd District and 9th District.  In addition, the counties of Calumet, Green Lake, Manitowoc, Marquette, Waushara and Winnebago were included in their entirety.  The population of the 6th District according to the 1980 census was 522,546.

Census of 1990 
 The 1990 census saw Wisconsin retain its nine seats in the House of Representatives and created only minor changes to the 6th District.  All or portions of Adams, Brown, Calumet, Fond du Lac, Green Lake, Juneau, Manitowoc, Marquette, Monroe, Outagamie, Sheboygan, Waupaca, Waushara, and Winnebago counties were part of the Sixth.

Census of 2000 
Following the 2000 census, Wisconsin's population rose to 5,363,675. Because this growth was not as large as in other parts of the nation, Wisconsin lost a congressional seat. Now with only eight seats, a major redistricting took place in the state for the first time since the state's loss of its 10th seat following the census of 1970.  The new 6th District included the counties of Adams, Calumet, Dodge, Fond du Lac, Green Lake, Marquette, Manitowoc, Waushara and Winnebago, in addition to small sections of Outagamie and Jefferson counties.

Census of 2010 

Wisconsin held on to its eight seats in the House of Representatives following the census of 2010, although the district boundaries were changed by the state legislature to include Columbia and Ozaukee County, while no longer including Adams, Calumet, and most of Dodge County.  This isn't the first time the 6th congressional district included Ozaukee County. However this is the first time it include a portion of Milwaukee County. It included the northern suburb River Hills.

List of members representing the district

Recent election results

2012

2014

2016

2018

2020

Election results from recent presidential races

Historical district boundaries

See also

Wisconsin's congressional districts
List of United States congressional districts

References

 Congressional Biographical Directory of the United States 1774–present

External links 
Wisconsin's 6th Congressional District
University of Wisconsin Digital Collection - State of Wisconsin Blue Books

06